Birmingham Canal Navigations (BCN) is a network of canals connecting Birmingham, Wolverhampton, and the eastern part of the Black Country. The BCN is connected to the rest of the English canal system at several junctions. It was owned and operated by the Birmingham Canal Navigations Company from 1767 to 1948.

At its working peak, the BCN contained about 160 miles (257 km) of canals; today just over 100 miles (160 km) are navigable, and the majority of traffic is from tourist and residential narrowboats.

History

The earliest mention of the Birmingham Canal Navigation appears in Aris’s Birmingham Gazette on 11 April 1768 when it was reported that on 25 March 1768 the first general assembly of the Company of Proprietors of the Birmingham Canal Navigation was held at the Swann Inn, Birmingham, to raise funds to submit for an Act of Parliament. The first canal to be built in the area was the Birmingham Canal, authorised by the Birmingham Canal Navigation Act 1768 and built from 1768 to 1772 under the supervision of James Brindley from the, then, edge of Birmingham, with termini at Newhall Wharf (since built over) and Paradise Wharf (also known as Old Wharf) near to Gas Street Basin to meet the Staffordshire and Worcestershire Canal at Aldersley (north of Wolverhampton). It opened for business on 14 September 1772. 

In 1769 an Act was obtained to construct the canal through a detached portion of the county of Shropshire, near Oldbury, and it included powers to make reservoirs anywhere within 3 miles between Smethwick and Oldbury.

The Birmingham and Fazeley Canal, from Birmingham to Tamworth, followed in 1784 with the Birmingham Canal Company merging with the Birmingham and Fazeley Canal Company immediately, to form what was originally called the Birmingham and Birmingham and Fazeley Canal Company. This cumbersome name was short-lived, and the combined company became incorporated as the Birmingham Canal Navigations from 1794, as the network was expanded.

Between 1825 and 1837 the navigation was improved between Spon Lane, Deepfield and Wolverhampton, saving a distance of six miles, which reduced the toll on coal by 9d per ton.  At the same time the Titford Canal was constructed at a cost upwards of £200,000.

The junction with the Warwick and Birmingham Canal was made under powers of an Act of 1815. These improvements were all consolidated under an Act of 1835.

From 1839 to 1843 the Tame Valley Canal was built, along with the Bentley, Rushall and Walsall Junction Canals opening up the Cannock Chase and Wyrley coal districts to the town of Birmingham at a cost upwards of £570,000.

The Wyrley and Essington Canal was incorporated by the Birmingham Canal: Navigation Act 1792 which authorised the line from Wolverhampton to Sneyd Junction and Walsall. The extension to Huddlesford and the Lord Hay and Daw End branches were constructed under the Birmingham Canal Navigation Act 1794. This amalgamated with the Birmingham Canal Navigations in 1840.

In 1855 the Cannock Extension Canal and the Wyrley Bank Branch were added to the network at a cost upwards of £100,000.

From 1855 to 1858 the Netherton Tunnel and other improvements cost the company upwards of £350,000.

In 1776, the Dudley Canal was authorised from Parkhead to the junction with the Stourbridge Canal. The Parkhead to Tipton Green section including Dudley Tunnel was made under the Dudley Canal Act 1785 , and the extension from Parkhead to Selly Oak Junction with the Oxford and Birmingham Canal, including the Gorsty Hill and Lappal Tunnels under the Selly Oak Canal Act 1793. This canal became part of the Birmingham Canal Navigations in 1846.

It was re-established as a body corporate on 17 June 1835. It was taken over by the London and Birmingham Railway in 1846, and subsequently owned by the London and North Western Railway, then the London, Midland and Scottish Railway until the 1 January 1948 when it passed to the British Transport Commission.

Levels

The BCN is built on three main levels, each with its own reservoir.
  OD, the Birmingham Level;
  OD, the Wolverhampton Level;
  OD, the Walsall Level
These levels are linked by locks at various places on the network.

There are also stretches on their own levels.
 The Titford Canal and its branches were built at  OD, linked to the Titford Reservoir (Titford Pool). A feeder supplies water to the Edgbaston Reservoir.
 A short section of the BCN Old Main Line, at Smethwick Summit, was built at  OD. Pumps at either end were built to pump water used by the locks back to the summit – one at Spon Lane locks, and one at Smethwick locks: the Smethwick Engine. It also linked to the general Wolverhampton Level supply of water.

The canals of the BCN

BCN Main Line (originally known as the Birmingham Canal) from Aldersley Junction (north of Wolverhampton) to Gas Street Basin (at the Worcester Bar in central Birmingham), using some of the Old Main Line canal.
Old Main Line, originally terminating in Birmingham at two wharfs now built upon: Old Wharf (adjacent to Gas Street Basin) and Newhall Wharf.
New Main Line, a revised route for the Birmingham Canal, double towpathed, largely progressing in straight lines using cuttings and tunnels.
Bentley Canal (abandoned)
Birmingham and Fazeley Canal (from Old Turn Junction (by the National Indoor Arena), eastwards to the Coventry Canal at Fazeley Junction, and thence north-west as far as bridge 78.)
Digbeth Branch Canal
Bradley Locks Branch
Dudley Canal
Bumble Hole Branch Canal (part of a bypassed loop)
Dudley Canal Line No 1 (see also Dudley Tunnel)
Dudley Canal Line No 2 (about half dewatered; see also Lapal Tunnel; Netherton Reservoir)
The Two Locks Line (infilled)
The Engine Arm
Gower Branch Canal - linking the Birmingham and Wolverhampton levels, via three locks, at Tividale.
Icknield Port Loop (part of the Old Main Line cut off by Telford's improvements, now serving as a feeder from Edgbaston Reservoir)
Netherton Tunnel Branch Canal
Rushall Canal
Soho Loop (an old circuitous route cut off by Telford's improvements, originally with a branch, the Soho Branch  to Soho Wharf, serving the Soho Manufactory)
Spon Lane Locks Branch (between Bromford Junction and Spon Lane Junction on the Old Main Line - 3 locks, part of the original Wednesbury Canal, not to be confused with Spon Lane Branch, another name for Tat Bank Branch on the Titford Canal)
Titford Canal
Tame Valley Canal (a later canal cutting off some northern meanders)
Walsall Canal (a more modern canal connecting the main line with Walsall and forming a big northern loop with the Wyrley and Essington Canal)
Anson Branch
Walsall Branch Canal (Town Branch)
Wednesbury Oak Loop (part of the original Old Main Line, now incomplete)
Wednesbury Old Canal - part of the original Wednesbury Canal
Ridgacre Branch
Wyrley and Essington Canal (bought by the Birmingham Canal Navigations in 1840)
Anglesey Branch
Birchills Branch
Cannock Extension Canal
Daw End Branch Canal
Lord Hay's Branch (Lords Hayes Branch) (abandoned)

Linking canals
Coventry Canal (at Fazeley Junction)
Grand Union Canal (connects at Salford Junction and also Bordesley Junction (originally Warwick Bar)
Staffordshire and Worcestershire Canal (at Aldersley Junction)
Stourbridge Canal
Worcester and Birmingham Canal (connects the BCN Main Line at the Worcester Bar, (alongside Gas Street Basin), southwards, to the River Severn at Worcester)

Associated features
Chasewater (feeds Wyrley and Essington Canal)
Edgbaston Reservoir, originally called Rotton Park Reservoir, itself fed from Titford Reservoir (feeds Birmingham Old and New Line)

Engineers
James Brindley
Thomas Dadford
John Smeaton
Thomas Telford
James Walker

Society
The BCN Society is a registered charity (number 1091760) formed in 1968, which exists to conserve, improve and encourage a wide range of interests in the BCN. It publishes a quarterly journal. Boundary Post. From 1983, it erected signposts at most of the canal junctions on the BCN.

See also

The Smethwick Engine
Transport in Birmingham
Stourport Ring

References
 (There was no second volume)

 - canal maps and text

 - Highly detailed printed 1:30,000 sheet map

External links
 BCN Society
 Jim Shead's website
 1973 photographs
 

 

 
Transport in Wolverhampton
Transport in Birmingham, West Midlands
Canals in the West Midlands (county)
Tourist attractions in Birmingham, West Midlands
Works of Thomas Telford
History of Birmingham, West Midlands